The NoZe Brotherhood is a collegiate secret society at Baylor University.

Origin and description
Founded in Brooks Hall in 1918, the society was originally formed as a joke regarding Leonard Shoaf, a freshman with a large nose. Shoaf's nose was of "such great length and breadth of nostril" that his friends proclaimed they could "form a club around it".  The group was said to be named noZe just after Shoaf's nose, but all the members in the group had peculiar noses.  The group was formed by a group of men who often met inside of Brooks and decided they wanted to create their own men's club, since the Baylor University Chamber of Commerce was the only other option.

The society became a popular, irreverent campus fixture in the years that followed, poking fun at its rivals, the Baylor University Chamber of Commerce, appearing in Baylor's yearbook the Round-Up, and writing the occasional humorous piece for the yearbook or Baylor's newspaper, The Lariat.  Targets of the NoZe Brothers' mirth have included Baylor's faculty, administration, the Southern Baptist Convention, various student organizations, and themselves. From the society's inception in the 1920s through to the early 1960s, members were open about their participation, but they now keep their identities secret.

Traditions
The society has always venerated its history and traditions through the observance of several key festivals and holidays. The oldest, the Pink Tea, has been held annually since 1929. Held in the spring, the event affords members the opportunity to hear the "State of the Onion" address by the Lorde Mayor, celebrate the history of the society, and hear one or more addresses by guest speakers (usually Baylor faculty) and neophyte members.

Many of the real names of the original members are impossible to find since they are all given NoZe Brother names and were known by that.

In 1924, the members of the club began wearing noses, a different one for each member, as well as unorthodox costumes.  This year, the club also began to accept members from dorms other than Brooks.

In order to rush into the NoZe Brotherhood, each potential new member had to submit an essay.  Their acceptance was based on both originality and creativity.  Each member needed to obtain and keep a 3.8 GPA, the highest GPA of any organization on campus many times.  Each pledge class that becomes a part of the brotherhood is required to complete a "class project."  This class project is basically a group prank.

In 1954, the society began publishing its own satirical newspaper, The Rope (spoofing the campus newspaper The Lariat), taking aim at Baylor University and the Baptist Church, employing satire and absurdity, and developing a unique writing style known as "NoZe prose".  The group kept a record of everything they did as a group called the "Holy Law."  Sadly sometime after World War II, the book was lost and has yet to be found.

NoZe Brothers who have graduated are known as "Exiles."

Reclusion
In the mid-1960s, the society's relationship with Baylor's administration became more precarious, due primarily to acts of vandalism: the repeated painting of a campus bridge in the traditional NoZe color of pink, followed by an alleged arson attack on the bridge, the details of which are disputed.

The society went underground, disguising members' identities with rubber noses and wigs. For some unknown reason, the Brothers changed the spelling from "nose" to "NoZe" and adopted a guerrilla profile, crashing various campus events such as "Sing", Chapel, and Homecoming parades.  The Rope continues to write about Baylor University and Baptist politics using satire and absurdity. However, over the last forty years the society has alternated between being officially allowed on campus and being banned. Currently the society is in the good graces of the Baylor Administration.

Members

Key figures in the NoZe Brotherhood include the Lorde Mayor, bearer of the Enlightening Rod of Elmo and the Cunning Linguist, who edits the Rope. The Bored of Graft consists of past Lordes Mayor, who are available to give advice to the current Lorde Mayor.

The society is liberal in handing out awards, titles, and various sobriquets; in fact, if a NoZeman feels that his fellow members have not seen fit to bestow sufficient honors upon him, he is encouraged to come up with his own. NoZe honors typically begin with the prefix "Keko Keeper of...", the meaning of which is apparently lost to history.

In NoZe lore, there are five types of people in the world. Members are NoZe Brothers; male non-members are "Infidels"; female non-members are "Hairylegs.""Fortunates" are infidels who are romantically involved to a greater or lesser degree with a NoZe Brother. "Exiles" are NoZe Brothers who have graduated or otherwise left the University.

The NoZe Brothers delight in praising the memory of Brother Long NoZe in prose and song  with ditties such as "This Old God", "When the NoZe is Blown up Yonder", and "Rock Around the Cross". The traditional NoZe saga "The Cry of the Enormous Rabbit" is usually recited semiannually. The NoZe prayer is basically "Now I Lay Me Down to Sleep" recited backwards with appropriate changes.

The society is based in Waco, Texas. It is forbidden for a NoZe Brother to reveal his identity to a non-member, unless it will directly result in him having sex. Every semester, the Brotherhood holds UnRush, an opportunity for non-members to present themselves for consideration by the society. The NoZe will announce the time and place of UnRush in the first Rope of the semester, and invite candidates to submit a humorous, satirical, or absurdist paper of 10,365 words or less. During UnRush, the Lorde Mayor will prophesy to and harangue the attendant masses on some matter of topical interest.

The current U.S. Senator from Kentucky, Rand Paul, was a member, according to GQ magazine.

Ornery brothers 

An ornery brother is an honorary member of the society.  Some include:

Bob Bullock — former Lt. Governor of Texas
George W. Bush — 43rd President of the United States
Bennet Cerf — "Bro. Board NoZe"; publisher and humorist
John Dean — "Bro. Dean of Dirty Tricks"; White House counsel to Richard Nixon
Kinky Friedman — "Bro. The Yellow NoZe of Texas"; country singer/Texas gubernatorial candidate/humorist
Hayden Fry — "Bro. Crotch Grabber"; college football coach
John Glenn — "Bro. GemiNoZe"; first American to orbit the Earth, former senator
Billy Graham — "Bro. Cracker NoZe Graham"; evangelist
Bob Hope — "Bro. SkiNoZe Hope"; comedian and actor
Leon Jaworski — "Bro. Water NoZe Jaworski"; Special Prosecutor during the Watergate Scandal
JOT -- "Bro. No Ma'am NoZe", Baylor cartoon character
John M. Lilley — "Bro. Easter NoZe"; 13th President of Baylor
Dan Rather —  "Bro. CBS Evening NoZe"; Former CBS news anchor
Robert Sloan — "Bro. Liniment NoZe"; 12th President of Baylor
William Underwood — "Bro. Pro BoNoZe"; President of Mercer University, former interim Baylor president
Kenneth Starr — "Bro. Non Hostis HumaNoZe Generis"; Independent Counsel whose investigation led to President Bill Clinton's impeachment, past Baylor President
Robert Griffin III — "Bro. HeismaNoZe Trophy"; Baylor quarterback and 77th recipient of the Heisman Trophy,
2011–12 Baylor Lady Bears basketball team — the entire team was inducted as "Bros. 40 and NoZe" following their undefeated national championship season

Disruptions

Integrating the Baylor Homecoming Parade 
Mud flaps on Waco Hall 
Dropping 4,000 ping-pong balls in chapel 
Turning Pat Neff pink 
Turning the fountain pink 
Postal Service Truck on Tidwell
Taking the ozone layer hostage 
Cancelling Homecoming
9.5 Theses on Waco Hall
Cancelling Diadeloso 
Winning Bear Downs via a four-man bike 
Killing Herb Reynolds 
Stealing 'The Rock' 
Student Union Shantytown
Giant NoZe Glasses on Old Main
24 Hour Secular Wall 
The Race for the Pure 
Bringing a Donkey to Chapel
Acting as interim Parking Service Attendants

Notes

References
 Long, William B. (1997). The Nose Brotherhood Knows: A Collection of Nothings and Non-Happenings, 1926–1965. Belton, Texas: Bear Hollow. 0-9617517-5-4.

External links
The NoZe Brotherhood, Official Website

1924 establishments in Texas
Baylor University
Collegiate secret societies
College humor magazines
Magazines established in 1954
Magazines published in Texas
Satirical magazines published in the United States
Student organizations established in 1924